Trichembola oreia is a moth in the family Gelechiidae. It was described by Jean Ghesquière in 1940. It is found in North Kivu in the Democratic Republic of the Congo.

References

Trichembola
Moths described in 1940
Endemic fauna of the Democratic Republic of the Congo